Francis Gormley (1899 – 20 December 1974) was an Irish politician and soldier. Gormley was born at Esker, Killoe, County Longford in 1899.

He was first elected to Dáil Éireann as a Fianna Fáil Teachta Dála (TD) for the Longford–Westmeath constituency at the 1932 general election. He lost his seat at the 1933 general election. He served as Secretary of the Dáil Courts before the Anglo-Irish Treaty.

He died in Longford in December 1974.

References

1899 births
1974 deaths
Fianna Fáil TDs
Members of the 7th Dáil
Politicians from County Longford